Meyrickella torquesauria is a moth of the family Noctuidae first described by Thomas Pennington Lucas in 1892. It is found in Queensland and New South Wales in Australia.

The wingspan is about 20 mm.

The larvae feed on Callitris columellaris.

References

Hypeninae
Moths described in 1892